Röhlig Logistics is an owner-run intercontinental sea and air freight business.

Röhlig has 165 offices in 35 countries on all continents with more than 2,300 employees.

Since 2009, the company is headquartered in the so-called "Haus am Fluss" at the river Weser in Bremen, Germany.

2021 marks the most successful year in the 170 years history of Röhlig Logistics, with gross sales of €1.5 billion and EBIT of €61 million.

Management 
Röhlig Logistics is managed by managing partner and executive chairman of the board Philip W. Herwig in the sixth generation. The Global Executive Board also includes:

 Hylton Grey, CEO Air Freight, Sea Freight, Contract Logistics & Projects (Chicago/USA)
 Ulrike Baum, Chief Human Resource Officer (Bremen/Deutschland)
 Dr. Robert Gutsche, Chief Financial Officer (Bremen/Deutschland)

History 
On May 1, 1852, the businessman Carl Röhlig founded the company Röhlig in Bremen as a tobacco trading company and agency for insurance companies. The freight forwarding business only took off in 1859. In times of industrialisation, free trade and the emerging steamship industry, the company managed to grow the transportation business.
After the death of Carl Röhlig in 1886, his sons Oskar and Eduard Röhlig continued to manage the company and founded branches in Hamburg, Bremerhaven and overseas. 
From 1913, Karl Herwig, son-in-law of Oskar Röhlig and great-uncle of the current owner, led the company in the third generation. The freight forwarding business changed rapidly. The industry brought large-volume goods on the way. Karl Herwig and his partner Adolf Backhus formed the company in the 1950s and 1960s to become one of the leading German freight forwarding companies.
In 1956 another generation change took place: the sons Consul Oscar Herwig and Walther Backhus together with Hans H. Schackow took over the management and continued to expand the business activities. The company entered new business areas: in parallel to the expansion of ocean freight transport, Röhlig strengthened its international airfreight business, the company's second largest business division. This accelerated the worldwide expansion of Röhlig, including new representative offices in Johannesburg and Sydney.

In 1985 Thomas W. Herwig took over the business in the fifth generation. The company has established offices in Poland, Hong Kong and Singapore, as well as offices in France, Italy and Spain. In the following years, new locations in India, North and South America as well as in Asia expanded the worldwide network. Thomas W. Herwig accounts responsible for the global expansion of Röhlig Logistics and its financial independence.

In January 2015, Thomas W. Herwig handed over the management of the company to his son Philip W. Herwig.

Ownership 
The Herwig family (Bremen) holds 85.2% of the shares in the company. 14.8% of the company shares are owned by Gabriele Belz (née Schackow).

Literature 
 Florian Langenscheidt, Peter May (publisher): Deutsche Standards: Aus bester Familie. Second revised edition, Deutsche Standards EDITIONEN, Cologne 2011.
 WFB Wirtschaftsförderung Bremen GmbH (publisher): Business Directory Maritime Industries/Logistics in the Federal State of Bremen. Bremen 2012.

References 

Transport companies established in 1852
Logistics companies of Germany
1852 establishments in Bremen
German companies established in 1852